Sayfallah Ltaief (born 22 April 2000) is a Tunisian professional footballer who plays as a winger for Winterthur on loan from Basel. Born in Switzerland, he plays for the Tunisia national team.

Career
Ltaief is a product of the youth academies of Zürich, Kosova Zürich, and Winterthur. He began his senior career in the Swiss Challenge League with Winterthur in 2020. On 9 June 2022, he transferred to Swiss Super League club Basel. He made his professional debut with Basel in a 1–1 Swiss Super League tie against his former club Winterthur on 16 July 2022.

On 5 December 2022, Ltaief agreed to return back to Winterthur on loan for the second half of the 2022–23 season.

International career
Ltaief was born in Switzerland and is of Tunisian descent. He was called up to represent the Tunisia U2s in 2022, and also had training sessions with the senior national team in preparation for the 2022 Kirin Cup. He made his debut with Tunisia as a late substitute in a 1–0 friendly win over Comoros on 22 September 2022.

Honours
Winterthur
 Swiss Challenge League: 2021–22

References

External links
 
 SFL Profile

2000 births
Living people
Footballers from Zürich
Tunisian footballers
Tunisia international footballers
Swiss men's footballers
Swiss people of Tunisian descent
Association football midfielders
FC Winterthur players
FC Basel players
Swiss Super League players
Swiss Challenge League players
Swiss Promotion League players